The following low-power television stations broadcast on digital or analog channel 36 in the United States:

 K36AB-D in Lawton, Oklahoma
 K36AC-D in Yuma, Colorado
 K36AE-D in Clarkdale, Arizona
 K36AI-D in Parowan/Enoch, etc., Utah
 K36AK-D in Blanding/Monticello, Utah
 K36BA-D in Burns, Oregon
 K36BQ-D in Pahrump, Nevada
 K36BW-D in Thompson Falls, Montana
 K36BX-D in Coos Bay, Oregon
 K36CA-D in Memphis, Texas
 K36CC-D in Tulia, Texas
 K36CW-D in Dodson, Montana
 K36CX-D in Boulder, Montana
 K36DB-CD in Avon/Vail, Colorado
 K36DI-D in Santa Rosa, New Mexico
 K36DK-D in Joplin, Montana
 K36DP-D in Pendleton, Oregon
 K36EW-D in College Place, Washington
 K36FF-D in Shurz, Nevada
 K36FG-D in Hood River, etc., Oregon
 K36FM-D in Beaver, etc., Utah
 K36FQ-D in Wagon Mound, New Mexico
 K36FS-D in Randolph, Utah
 K36FT-D in Santa Clara, etc., Utah
 K36FZ-D in Meadview, Arizona
 K36GJ-D in Agana, Guam
 K36GL-D in Lovelock, Nevada
 K36GQ-D in Parlin, Colorado
 K36GU-D in Rockaway Beach, Oregon
 K36GX-D in Basalt, Colorado
 K36HA-D in Elko, Nevada
 K36HH-D in Susanville, etc., California
 K36HM-D in Fort Dick, California
 K36IB-D in Midland, etc., Oregon
 K36IF-D in Orangeville, Utah
 K36IG-D in Antimony, Utah
 K36IH-D in Ignacio, Colorado
 K36II-D in Joplin, Missouri
 K36IJ-D in Anahola, etc., Hawaii
 K36IK-D in Delta, Oak City, etc., Utah
 K36IL-D in Hanna & Tabiona, Utah
 K36IM-D in Duchesne, etc., Utah
 K36IO-D in Manhattan, Kansas
 K36IQ-D in Vernal, etc., Utah
 K36IR-D in Garrison, etc., Utah
 K36IY-D in Weatherford, Oklahoma
 K36JB-D in Cripple Creek, Colorado
 K36JD-D in Jackson, Wyoming
 K36JH-D in Barstow, California
 K36JO-D in Cheyenne, Wyoming
 K36JS-D in Grants, New Mexico
 K36JT-D in Clear Creek, Utah
 K36JV-D in East Price, Utah
 K36JW-D in Spring Glen, Utah
 K36JX-D in Many Farms, Arizona
 K36JZ-D in Roseburg, Oregon
 K36KD-D in Tierra Amarilla, New Mexico
 K36KE-D in Ardmore, Oklahoma
 K36KH-D in Alexandria, Minnesota
 K36KI-D in Fillmore, etc., Utah
 K36KN-D in Eureka, Nevada
 K36KR-D in Elmo/Big Arm, Montana
 K36KW-D in Redwood Falls, Minnesota
 K36KZ-D in Max, Minnesota
 K36LA-D in Kabetogama, Minnesota
 K36LB-D in Cheyenne Wells, Colorado
 K36LD-D in College Station, Texas
 K36LE-D in Manila, etc., Utah
 K36LF-D in Taos, New Mexico
 K36LU-D in Ely, Nevada
 K36LW-D in Williams, Minnesota
 K36LX-D in Jacks Cabin, Colorado
 K36LZ-D in Garden Valley, Idaho
 K36MI-D in Fountain Green, Utah
 K36MU-D in Texarkana, Arkansas
 K36NB-D in Incline Village, Nevada
 K36ND-D in Victoria, Texas
 K36NE-D in Las Vegas, Nevada
 K36NN-D in West Plains, Missouri
 K36NO-D in Alton, etc., Utah
 K36NP-D in Baker Valley, Oregon
 K36NQ-D in Altus, Oklahoma
 K36NR-D in Seiling, Oklahoma
 K36NV-D in Strong City, Oklahoma
 K36NX-D in Pringle, South Dakota
 K36NZ-D in Clarkston, Washington
 K36OA-D in Red Lake, Minnesota
 K36OB-D in Verdi, Nevada
 K36OD-D in North La Pine, Oregon
 K36OE-D in Garfield County, Utah
 K36OF-D in Ursine, Nevada
 K36OH-D in Fremont, Utah
 K36OI-D in Manti/Ephraim, Utah
 K36OJ-D in Rainier, Oregon
 K36OM-D in Tropic, Utah
 K36ON-D in Escalante, Utah
 K36OO-D in Boulder, Utah
 K36OP-D in Hanksville, Utah
 K36OQ-D in Caineville, Utah
 K36OR-D in Logan, Utah
 K36OS-D in Whitehall, Montana
 K36OT-D in Coalville, Utah
 K36OU-D in Mountain View, Wyoming
 K36OV-D in Wanship, Utah
 K36OW-D in Henefer & Echo, Utah
 K36OX-D in Samak, Utah
 K36OY-D in Sterling, Colorado
 K36OZ-D in Hakalau, Hawaii
 K36PA-D in Kanarraville, etc., Utah
 K36PB-D in Lewistown, Montana
 K36PC-D in Emery, Utah
 K36PD-D in Green River, Utah
 K36PE-D in Peach Springs, Arizona
 K36PF-D in Ferron, Utah
 K36PJ-D in Howard, Montana
 K36PK-D in Peoa, etc., Utah
 K36PL-D in Park City, Utah
 K36PM-D in Salmon, Idaho
 K36PN-D in Beowawe, Nevada
 K36PO-D in Winnemucca, Nevada
 K36PP-D in Farmington, etc., New Mexico
 K36PS-D in Julesburg, Colorado
 K36PT-D in Haxtun, Colorado
 K36PU-D in Pioche, Nevada
 K36PV-D in Gallup, New Mexico
 K36PW-D in Priest Lake, Idaho
 K36PX-D in Caliente, Nevada
 K36PY-D in Pagosa Springs, Colorado
 K36PZ-D in Big Spring, Texas
 K36QA-D in Lufkin, Texas
 K36QB-D in Cortez, Colorado
 K36QD-D in Omaha, Nebraska
 K36QM-D in Iowa, Louisiana
 K39CZ-D in Aberdeen, South Dakota
 K39JX-D in Livingston, etc., Montana
 K45CH-D in Fort Peck, Montana
 K47GI-D in Grants Pass, Oregon
 K49IG-D in Yreka, California
 K50CT-D in Cottage Grove, Oregon
 K50HZ-D in Willmar, Minnesota
 KADO-CD in Shreveport, Louisiana
 KAZT-CD in Phoenix, Arizona
 KBFK-LP in Bakersfield, California
 KBNS-CD in Branson, Missouri
 KBTR-CD in Baton Rouge, Louisiana
 KBWU-LD in Richland, etc., Washington
 KCBZ-LD in Casper, Wyoming
 KCDL-LD in Boise, Idaho
 KEVC-CD in Indio, California
 KFFS-CD in Fayetteville, Arkansas
 KGKM-LD in Columbia, Missouri
 KGMM-CD in San Antonio, Texas
 KHHI-LD in Honolulu, Hawaii
 KHSL-TV in Redding, California
 KJTB-LD in Paragould, Arkansas
 KJWY-LD in Salem, Oregon
 KKAX-LD in Hilltop, Arizona
 KKEI-CD in Portland, Oregon
 KLGV-LD in Longview, Texas
 KLMB-CD in El Dorado, Arkansas
 KLML-LD in Grand Junction, Colorado
 KMQV-LD in Rochester, Minnesota
 KPWT-LD in Astoria, Oregon
 KSBO-CD in San Luis Obispo, California
 KSKT-CD in San Marcos, California
 KTFO-CD in Austin, Texas
 KTMF-LD in Kalispell, Montana
 KTPN-LD in Tyler, Texas
 KUIL-LD in Beaumont, Texas
 KUOK-CD in Oklahoma City, Oklahoma
 KUVE-CD in Tucson, Arizona
 KVES-LD in Palm Springs, California
 KWYT-LD in Yakima, Washington
 KXTV (DRT) in West Sacramento, California
 KZOD-LD in Odessa, Texas
 W24CP-D in Durham, North Carolina
 W36DO-D in Darby, Pennsylvania
 W36EA-D in Tallahassee, Florida
 W36EC-D in Bartow, Florida, to move to channel 15
 W36EI-D in Wausau, Wisconsin
 W36EO-D in La Grange, Georgia
 W36EP-D in Yauco, Puerto Rico, to move to channel 35
 W36EQ-D in Liberal, Kansas
 W36EX-D in Alton, Illinois
 W36EY-D in Berwick, Pennsylvania
 W36FA-D in Hesperia, Michigan
 W36FB-D in Biscoe, North Carolina
 W36FE-D in Hanover, New Hampshire
 W36FH-D in Traverse City, Michigan
 W36FJ-D in Sebring, Florida
 W36FK-D in Pittsburgh, Pennsylvania
 W36FM-D in Etna, Maine
 WASV-LD in Asheville, North Carolina
 WBFT-CD in Sanford, North Carolina
 WBXI-CD in Indianapolis, Indiana
 WBXN-CD in New Orleans, Louisiana
 WCAY-CD in Key West, Florida
 WCEA-LD in Boston, Massachusetts
 WCNT-LP in Chattanooga, Tennessee
 WDSF-LD in Montgomery, Alabama
 WEIN-LD in Evansville, Indiana
 WGCB-LD in Hinesville-Richmond, Georgia
 WGCW-LD in Albany, Georgia
 WGOX-LD in Mobile, Alabama
 WHDO-CD in Orlando, Florida
 WIMN-CD in Arecibo, Puerto Rico
 WMKE-CD in Milwaukee, Wisconsin
 WMNT-CD in Toledo, Ohio
 WMVS in Milwaukee, Wisconsin
 WNGN-LD in Troy, New York
 WNTE-LD in Mayaguez, Puerto Rico, to move to channel 30
 WODP-LD in Fort Wayne, Indiana
 WPMC-CD in Mappsville, Virginia
 WRID-LD in Richmond, Virginia
 WRJK-LD in Arlington Heights, Illinois
 WSPF-CD in St. Petersburg, Florida
 WSVF-CD in Harrisonburg, Virginia
 WSWB in Scranton, Pennsylvania
 WWLM-CD in Washington, Pennsylvania
 WXWZ-LD in Guayama, Puerto Rico
 WYCN-LD in Boston, Massachusetts
 WYSJ-CD in Yorktown, Virginia
 WZDT-LP in Naples, Florida

The following stations, which are no longer licensed, formerly broadcast on analog or digital channel 36:
 K36AF-D in New Castle, Colorado
 K36BR in Fraser, etc., Colorado
 K36BT in Blue Lake, California
 K36DC in Beowawe, etc., Nevada
 K36DU in Lake Havasu City, etc., Arizona
 K36ED in Fairbanks, Alaska
 K36EZ in Billings, Montana
 K36FX in Green River, Utah
 K36GO in Morongo Valley, California
 K36HL in Grants Pass, Oregon
 K36HV-D in Wallowa, Oregon
 K36IN-D in Fruitland, etc., Utah
 K36KA-D in Rolla, Missouri
 K36KL-D in Gruver, Texas
 K36MA-D in Perryton, Texas
 K36NJ-D in Monett, Missouri
 K36OK-D in Granite Falls, Minnesota
 K36QI-D in Quartz Creek, etc., Montana
 KDVT-LP in Denver, Colorado
 KJCN-LP in Paso Robles, California
 KKNJ-LP in Alamogordo, New Mexico
 KXHD-LP in Montrose, Colorado
 KXOR-LP in Eugene, Oregon
 KXTY-LP in Ely, Nevada
 KZMB-LD in Enid, Oklahoma
 W36AC in McComb, Mississippi
 W36BE-D in State College, Pennsylvania
 WHSH-LP in Rochester, New York

References

36 low-power